Akhat Ashirov (born 8 May 1970) is a Kazakhstani judoka. He competed in the men's lightweight event at the 1996 Summer Olympics.

References

External links
 

1970 births
Living people
Kazakhstani male judoka
Olympic judoka of Kazakhstan
Judoka at the 1996 Summer Olympics
Place of birth missing (living people)